The Discovery Saloon is a historic building at 1st and D Streets in Nome, Alaska.  Now a private residence, this two-story wood-frame building with false front was built in 1901 by Max Gordon, who operated a high-end public establishment on the premises.  It is the oldest commercial building in Nome, and one of the few to survive from Nome's gold rush days.  It was converted to one of Nome's finest private residences in the 1940s.

The building was listed on the National Register of Historic Places in 1980.

See also
National Register of Historic Places listings in Nome Census Area, Alaska

References

1901 establishments in Alaska
Houses completed in 1901
Buildings and structures in Nome Census Area, Alaska
Drinking establishments on the National Register of Historic Places in Alaska
Drinking establishments in Alaska
Houses in Unorganized Borough, Alaska
Houses on the National Register of Historic Places in Alaska
Buildings and structures on the National Register of Historic Places in Nome Census Area, Alaska
Nome, Alaska